Glyphostoma thalassoma is a species of sea snail, a marine gastropod mollusk in the family Clathurellidae.

Description
The shell grows to a length of 20 mm.

Distribution
This species occurs in the Gulf of California, Western Mexico.

References

External links
 

thalassoma